The Zipit wireless messenger is a small clamshell device originally produced by Aeronix, which is now under the spin-off Zipit Wireless, Inc., that enables Instant Messaging (AOL Instant Messenger, Yahoo! Messenger, MSN Messenger). The newer Z2 also supports SMS while on Wi-Fi wireless networks.  The Zipit Wireless Messenger received the iParenting Media Award in 2005 and the Zipit Z2 was awarded “DigitalLife 2007 Best of Show – Portable Gear” by PC Magazine.  The Z1 was also recognized by the InnoVision Technology Awards as an award winner in the Technology Application category.

Geekcorps, a humanitarian organization trying to bridge the Digital Divide has proposed the Zipit as a leading low-cost communication device.

Z2
On Sept. 27, 2007, Zipit Wireless introduced the Zipit wireless messenger 2 (Z2). It has
 full 2.8 inch QVGA color display
 backlit keyboard
 Mini-SD memory card slot
 MP3 player (MyTunez), streaming audio support
 a photo viewer (MyPhotoz)
 XScale PXA270 312 MHz processor
 32 MB of SDRAM
 wifi 802.11b/g and now works with open, WEP, and WPA encrypted wireless networks.
 1230 mAh Lithium-ion Polymer rechargeable battery.
The Z2 runs Linux.

Homebrew 

A number of people have run Linux on the Z2. The most common implementation uses Debian with the Fluxbox window manager. This installation supports mouse emulation, the dillo web browser, pidgin, and other Linux programs.

References

External links
 Zipit home page
 Zipit linux community site
 Zipit details from ElkGroveWireless
 Zipit hacking from Karosium: 1 2 3 4 5 6 7
 Zipit disassembly guide
 Zipit serial modification
  Zipit review, with excellent color photo.
 Zipit review

Embedded Linux
Linux-based devices
Computer-related introductions in 2007